Pseudanthonomus helvolus is a species of true weevil in the beetle family Curculionidae. It is found in North America.

References

Further reading

External links

 

Curculioninae
Articles created by Qbugbot
Beetles described in 1843